Gongoryn Myeryei (born 31 July 1967) is a Mongolian cross-country skier. He competed in the men's 10 kilometre classical event at the 1992 Winter Olympics.

References

External links
 

1967 births
Living people
Mongolian male cross-country skiers
Olympic cross-country skiers of Mongolia
Cross-country skiers at the 1992 Winter Olympics
Place of birth missing (living people)
Asian Games medalists in cross-country skiing
Cross-country skiers at the 1990 Asian Winter Games
Asian Games bronze medalists for Mongolia
Medalists at the 1990 Asian Winter Games
20th-century Mongolian people